Grand Rapids Township is one of the nineteen townships of Wood County, Ohio, United States.  The 2010 census found 1,607 people in the township, 642 of whom lived in the unincorporated portions of the township.

Geography
Located in the northwestern part of the county, it borders the following townships:
Providence Township, Lucas County - north
Washington Township - east
Weston Township - southeast
Damascus Township, Henry County - west
Washington Township, Henry County - northwest corner

Name and history
Grand Rapids Township was established in 1888. It is the only Grand Rapids Township statewide.

Government
The township is governed by a three-member board of trustees, who are elected in November of odd-numbered years to a four-year term beginning on the following January 1. Two are elected in the year after the presidential election and one is elected in the year before it. There is also an elected township fiscal officer, who serves a four-year term beginning on April 1 of the year after the election, which is held in November of the year before the presidential election. Vacancies in the fiscal officership or on the board of trustees are filled by the remaining trustees.

The Grand Rapids Township Hall is located at the Grand Rapids Township Fire Department in Grand Rapids on Wapokeneta Road and Third Street.

References

External links
County website

Townships in Wood County, Ohio
Townships in Ohio